Aztec Municipal Schools (also known as the Aztec Municipal School District) is a public school district based in Aztec, New Mexico, United States. The district covers a  area in northeastern San Juan County.

In addition to Aztec, the district also serves northern Bloomfield and the communities of Cedar Hill, Center Point, and La Boca. The district also includes most of Flora Vista, North Light Plant, and Spencerville, as well as portions of Crouch Mesa and Navajo Dam.

Schools
Aztec High School (Grades 9-12)
Koogler Middle School (Grades 6-8)
Park Avenue Elementary School (Grades 4-5)
McCoy Elementary School (Grades PK-3)
Lydia Rippey Elementary School (Grades PK-3)
Vista Nueva High School (Alternative; Grades 9-12)

Enrollment
2007-2008 School Year: 3,251 students
2006-2007 School Year: 3,184 students
2005-2006 School Year: 3,244 students
2004-2005 School Year: 3,177 students
2003-2004 School Year: 3,229 students
2002-2003 School Year: 3,266 students
2001-2002 School Year: 3,379 students
2000-2001 School Year: 3,350 students

Demographics
There were a total of 3,251 students enrolled in Aztec Municipal Schools during the 2007-2008 school year. The gender makeup of the district was 48.91% female and 51.09% male. The racial makeup of the district was 62.20% White, 23.41% Hispanic, 12.89% Native American, 0.83% African American, and 0.68% Asian/Pacific Islander.

See also
List of school districts in New Mexico

References

External links
Aztec Municipal Schools – Official site.

School districts in New Mexico
Education in San Juan County, New Mexico